The Malabar lark, or Malabar crested lark (Galerida malabarica) is a species of lark in the family Alaudidae found in western India.

Taxonomy and systematics
Originally, the Malabar lark was classified in the genus Alauda before being moved to its present genus. Also, some authorities have considered the Thekla lark to be a subspecies of the Malabar lark.

Description
This is a smallish lark, slightly smaller than the Eurasian skylark. It has a long spiky erectile crest. It is greyer than the skylark, and lacks the white wing and tail edges of that species, which is a winter visitor to India.

It is very similar to the crested lark, which breeds in northern India. The Malabar lark is smaller and dark-streaked reddish brown in plumage, whereas the crested lark is grey. The belly is white. The sexes are similar.

Sykes's lark is another Indian relative that also has reddish-brown plumage, but is smaller, shorter-billed, with a stiff upright crest and has plain rufous underparts.

Distribution and habitat
The Malabar lark is found in western India. It is a common bird of open country, cultivation and scrub, often at some altitude.

Behaviour and ecology
The Malabar lark is a sedentary breeding bird that nests on the ground, laying two or three eggs. Its food is seeds and insects, the latter especially in the breeding season.

Gallery

References

Galerida
Birds of India
Birds described in 1786